Julio César Dely Valdés (born March 12, 1967) is a Panamanian former professional footballer who played as a striker. He is a twin brother of Jorge Dely Valdés and younger brother of Armando Dely Valdés.

Club career
Born in Colón, Dely Valdés began his professional career in 1987 in Argentina with Deportivo Paraguayo of Argentina (after trying up to get in the Argentinos Juniors' Squad), where he scored 28 goals. He then moved to Club Nacional de Football in Uruguay, where he scored more than 100 goals and won the Uruguayan Championship in 1992.

In Europe, he played for Cagliari in Serie A and Paris Saint-Germain alongside Brazilian players like Raí and Leonardo in the French Première Division.

Nicknamed Panagol, he then played in Spain's Primera División with Real Oviedo for three seasons and with Málaga for another three, where he became the most prolific goal scorer in Málaga's history in Primera División, before returning to Nacional.

He finished out his career in 2006 after playing two seasons with Panamanian club Arabe Unido.

International career
Dely Valdés made his debut for Panama in a May 1991 UNCAF Nations Cup match against Honduras and earned a total of 44 caps, scoring 18 goals. He represented his country in 27 FIFA World Cup qualification matches and was a member of the 2005 CONCACAF Gold Cup team, who finished second in the tournament, losing the final against USA in the penalty shootout. He also played at the 2001 and 2003 UNCAF Nations Cups.

Both he and his twin brother announced their international retirement in November 2004, but they both returned for a final Gold Cup tournament and World Cup qualification matches in 2005. His final international was an October 2005 FIFA World Cup qualification match against the United States, just as his twin brother Jorge.

International goals
Scores and results list Panama's goal tally first, score column indicates score after each Dely Valdés goal.

Managerial career
Dely Valdés became a coach after his playing career ended. He signed with his former team, Málaga, as an assistant manager for head coach Antonio Tapia. He left the club on June 16, 2010, after the arrival of new Qatari owner Abdullah bin Nasser bin Abdullah Al Ahmed Al Thani. The entire team and staff was rebuilt, and Dely Valdés did not have a contract.

On September 14, 2010, Dely Valdés became head coach of the Panama national football team. He became coach after FEPAFUT chose him over the Colombian Luis Fernando Suarez. He had a contract for 10 months to coach the national team for the Copa Centroamericana and the CONCACAF Gold Cup. The contract had an option to be extended to include the FIFA World Cup qualifiers. He appointed twin brother Jorge as his assistant. They led Panama to the final round of World Cup qualifying, but ultimately fell short. After failing to qualify for the World Cup, the Dely Valdés brothers did not continue managing Panama.

Julio was put in charge at Árabe Unido in August 2014 and was announced as the manager at Águila in El Salvador on December 31, 2014.

Honours
Nacional
Primera División Uruguaya: 1992

Paris Saint-Germain
Trophée des Champions: 1995
UEFA Cup Winners' Cup: 1995–96

Malaga
UEFA Intertoto Cup: 2002

Individual
IFFHS CONCACAF Men's Team of All Time: 2021

References

External links
 
 

1967 births
Living people
Sportspeople from Colón, Panama
Panamanian twins
Twin sportspeople
Association football forwards
Panamanian footballers
Panama international footballers
2001 UNCAF Nations Cup players
2003 UNCAF Nations Cup players
2005 CONCACAF Gold Cup players
Deportivo Paraguayo footballers
Club Nacional de Football players
Uruguayan Primera División players
Cagliari Calcio players
Serie A players
Paris Saint-Germain F.C. players
Ligue 1 players
Real Oviedo players
Málaga CF players
La Liga players
C.D. Árabe Unido players
Panamanian expatriate footballers
Expatriate footballers in Argentina
Expatriate footballers in Uruguay
Expatriate footballers in Italy
Expatriate footballers in France
Expatriate footballers in Spain
Panamanian football managers
Panama national football team managers
2011 CONCACAF Gold Cup managers
C.D. Águila managers
2019 CONCACAF Gold Cup managers